Ken Chang or Chang Tzu-yao is a Taiwanese actor and Mandopop singer who grew up in Brazil since the age of 3.

Career 
In 1998, Chang started his film career in G.Y. Sir, a Taiwanese comedy film.
Chang has appeared in Taiwan films and  Hong Kong films. Chang has also appeared in television series from China.

Filmography

Films

Television

Discography
 1998 - Un dos tres (她是誰)

References

External links 

 - HKMdb identifies Chang as Ken Cheung Chi-Yiu.
 Ken Cheung Chi Yiu at hkcinemagic.com
 Ken Chang at viewasian.tv
 Ken Chang at chinesemedia360.com

1975 births
Living people
Taiwanese Buddhists
21st-century Brazilian male actors
Brazilian people of Taiwanese descent
Taiwanese male film actors
Taiwanese male television actors
Brazilian Buddhists
Brazilian male film actors
Brazilian male television actors